Scythris bjoernstadi is a moth of the family Scythrididae. It was described by Bengt Å. Bengtsson in 2014. It is found in Tanzania.

References

bjoernstadi
Moths described in 2014